CinéMagique was a theatre show at Walt Disney Studios Park in Disneyland Paris mixing the live performance of an actor with synchronized movie scenes on a big screen. The attraction opened with the park on March 16, 2002, starring Martin Short and Julie Delpy. The last show was on March 29, 2017, and was replaced by the Marvel Super Heroes United stuntshow. The show temporarily returned from December 1, 2018 to February 3, 2019. This "revisited" version of the show featured additional special effects.

Plot 

The show began with a castmember reciting an opening spiel regarding the nature of the show : “Today, you are going to see a movie on the history of cinema spanning from silent films to today's modern films.” The movie started playing a montage of early black-and-white films. After a few moments, a cell phone ring was heard, and a man in the front rows answered it. He eluded the castmember and walked on the stage while talking.

Meanwhile, the love scene on screen between a Prince and a Princess was interrupted by this man's noisy conversation. The angered Prince attempted to stop him, but was unable to reach him due to the movie screen. He then enlisted the help of a nearby Magician to silence him. This Magician executed a magic trick which made the man disappear from the stage in a plume of smoke, and reappear inside the movie (here portrayed by Martin Short). Short's character (known as "George") seemed unable to recover from his surprise, and the Prince corrected him by punching him in the face. As the Prince and the Magician left, the Princess (called "Marguerite"), portrayed by Julie Delpy, comforted poor George. Yet, the Prince, seeing this, started chasing after him with a sword.

George escaped via a window to suddenly find out he was on the ledge of a high building with Harold Lloyd, in the scene of the clock tower from the Safety Last!. George found a fire escape and eventually made it to the ground. Just as he thought he was safe, a pie was thrown at his face. He could see that many others in the street, including Charlie Chaplin and Laurel & Hardy, were engaged in throwing pies at one another. George got into the action, and discovered he can talk, meaning he had left silent movies.

Then, after angering an armed man by throwing a pie at him, George was backed down against a wall by a group of gangsters, in the scene from Angels with Dirty Faces. Before he was shot, two men appeared behind the gangsters, distracting them and allowing him to escape. However, George's escape was too noisy, and alerted the gangsters, who started shooting at him. Clips here included scenes from Some Like It Hot. George then crashed through a window. At this point, he had left the realm of black-and-white films.

As George stood up, he realized he was part of scenes from the movies Once Upon a Time in the West and The Good, the Bad and the Ugly, with bandits standing before him. As George's phone rang, the scene used Sergio Leone's method of extreme close-ups to build up a shootout. George reached for the phone and the shootout started using footage from multiple westerns, including The Magnificent Seven. In his attempt to escape the gunfire, George dropped his phone, and then sought refuge in a nearby shed filled with TNT and other explosives. A cowboy then shot a crate of TNT, and sent George flying into the air.

George came blasting out of a chimney on the rooftops of London, thrust into the universe of Mary Poppins. He was then immediately sucked into the song "Step In Time". Meanwhile, Maguerite had been following George, whom she fell in love with, and arrived in the scene of the shootout. She could  only find George's phone on the ground. The film cut back to George walking down a street during pouring rain (from The Umbrellas of Cherbourg). There, he met  Marguerite, who handed his phone back. Then, they called a taxi, but George was sucked down a puddle he jumped into. Marguerite attempted to follow him, but is unable to.

George had now dived underwater, coming across the Red October submarine from The Hunt for Red October (Marko Ramius was startled to see George through the periscope). George also met the divers from The Big Blue. Then, as he swam away, he encountered Pinocchio, who attempted to warn him about a large whale. Suddenly, Monstro awakened and chased both George and Pinocchio.

Upon reaching the surface, George saw the Titanic approaching him. He got helped out onto the bow by a lookout, only to see the ship hitting the iceberg. As passengers started running to the escape boats, George heard Jack Dawson calling for his life, and reached the corridor of doors to find him. He opened random doors, each one revealing someone else behind. The scenes included John Cleese from A Fish Called Wanda, Inspector Clouseau from The Pink Panther, Hannibal Lecter from The Silence of the Lambs, Sulley from Monsters, Inc., and  Linda Blair from The Exorcist. Then, as the water was flooding the corridor, and right before George met his demise, the wall he stood against opens up and he was grabbed.

George was now aboard the Death Star. He was quickly grabbed by a stormtrooper, who took him to a hidden corner, just in time to elude Darth Vader walking down the corridor. This helpful stormtrooper was then revealed to be Marguerite. Yet, real stormtroopers started chasing them through the space station, and to escape, they re-enacted the scene where Princess Leia and Luke Skywalker used the wire to traverse the chasm.

As they landed on the other side, they were in a medieval setting. A nearby Knight noticed George and Marguerite, and walked over to them. George begged for his help to get back to the other side of the screen in the real world. However, havoc broke loose. Armies descended and a battle ensued between knights. Kevin Costner as Robin Hood shot an arrow toward Marguerite, but she was saved by George jumping on its way to stop it. The arrow had clearly punctured his heart, and the fighting stops. As the Knight removed it, he found out that it had actually stabbed George's cell phone. Scared by its ringtone, the Knight crushed it. Then, he walked to the top of the hill and lightning struck his sword. He threw it toward the screen, breaking it open and creating a portal allowing George to travel back to the Theater. He does so, but the portal closed before Marguerite crosses it. Finally, the Magician returned and created a door for George to walk through. George then decided to go back into screen, and the movie ended with a loving embrace between them, complemented by a montage of famous on-screen kisses. The show closed with George and Marguerite skipping toward the Emerald City from The Wizard of Oz

Halfway through 2013, some scenes (when George opened doors in the Titanic, and during the 'kissing' scene at the end) were replaced by scenes from newer movies such as: Ratatouille, Toy Story 3, The Incredibles and The Chronicles of Narnia.

List of featured films
As mentioned in the Plot summary above, the attraction showcased scenes from a wide variety of films. Below is a complete listing of the films shown, in order of appearance:

Workers Leaving the Lumière Factory, The Kiss,  L'Arrivée d'un train en gare de La Ciotat, The Great Train Robbery, A Trip to the Moon, The Birth of a Nation, Cops, Plane Crazy, Napoléon, The Battleship Potemkin, Nosferatu, The Cabinet of Dr. Caligari, Metropolis, The Sheik, Safety Last!, The Battle of the Century, Behind The Screen, Angels with Dirty Faces, Some Like It Hot, Once Upon a Time in the West, The Good, the Bad and the Ugly, Tombstone, The Wild Bunch, The Magnificent Seven, Mary Poppins, The Umbrellas of Cherbourg, The Hunt for Red October, The Big Blue, Pinocchio, Titanic, A Fish Called Wanda, Trois Hommes et un Couffin, The Pink Panther, The Silence of the Lambs, Monsters, Inc., The Exorcist, Star Wars Episode IV: A New Hope, The Three Musketeers, Highlander, Ran, El Cid, Henri V, Monty Python and the Holy Grail, Robin Hood: Prince of Thieves, Summertime, Doctor Zhivago, Casablanca, Gone with the Wind, A Man and a Woman, Wuthering Heights, Ridicule, The Horseman on the Roof, The Rules of the Game, The Black Orchid, A Place in the Sun, Carmen Jones, Cyrano de Bergerac, Who Framed Roger Rabbit, Brave Little Tailor, To Catch a Thief, The Messenger: The Story of Joan of Arc, The Wizard of Oz

Cast 
 Martin Short: George
 Julie Delpy: Marguerite
 Alan Cumming: The Magician
 Tcheky Karyo: The Knight

References

Amusement rides introduced in 2002
Walt Disney Parks and Resorts attractions
Walt Disney Studios Park
Production Courtyard (Walt Disney Studios Park)
2002 establishments in France
2017 disestablishments in France